David Steele (born August 13, 1953, in Jacksonville, Florida) is an American television and radio sports broadcaster. He is an announcer on the NBA's Orlando Magic basketball games on Bally Sports Sun and Bally Sports Florida.

Career

Orlando Magic
He assumed the play-by-play duties for the Orlando Magic's TV broadcasts in 1998, teaming up initially with Jack Givens, then later with former NBA player, head coach and veteran NBA color commentator Matt Guokas. Steele replaced Chip Caray as the teams' play-by-play announcer after serving as the Magic radio play-by-play announcer for nine seasons. Steele also serves as a sports columnist for  foxsportsflorida.com.

In voting for the 2010 NBA MVP award, Steele was one of three people to vote Dwight Howard 1st place on the ballot.

In 2014, Steele announced an NCAA national semifinal between the Florida Gators and Connecticut Huskies for the Gators' teamcast on TNT. He also announced a game on TNT between the Florida Gators basketball versus Georgia Bulldogs basketball.

Awards and recognitions
Steele has been named "Sportscaster of the Year" in Florida and North Carolina. He is a past president of the Florida Sportscasters Association.

Personal life
Steele and his wife, Sally, have three children. They live in Winter Park, Florida, a North Orlando suburb.

External links
David Steele bio sketch at Sun Sports TV website
David Steel's blog at Orlando Magic website

1953 births
Living people
American radio sports announcers
American television sports announcers
College basketball announcers in the United States
College football announcers
Florida Gators football announcers
Florida Gators men's basketball announcers
National Basketball Association broadcasters
National Football League announcers
Orlando Magic announcers
People from Jacksonville, Florida
Tampa Bay Buccaneers announcers
United States Football League announcers